Simon Kuznets Kharkiv National University of Economics is the largest economic higher educational and research institution in the eastern part of Ukraine. Established in 1912, since 2013 the university is named after American economist Simon Kuznets, its noted alumnus.

KhNUE provides a full range of undergraduate and postgraduate educational programs implementing multistage training, retraining and upgrading of qualification in 26 specialties in economy and business, management, public administration, informatics and cybernetics, computer sciences, publishing business and printing industry, tourism, international relations.

History

Foundation 
The initiative to create a special economic educational institution in Kharkiv was raised in 1888 by merchant and commerce-adviser Nikolay Orlov. It was promoted as a patriotic act timed in honor of the miraculous salvation of the royal family in the train accident at the Borky station near Kharkov. The Kharkiv merchant society established and inaugurated in 1893 the School of Commerce named after Alexander III. The school had eight years special secondary training curriculum. Next public initiative conceived by university professor N. Paliyenko resulted with opening of the Evening Higher Courses of Commerce in October (24) 10, 1912. The Higher Courses provided four years training in fields of enterprise and economy, local government, bank and finance, industrial management. After the Courses had received the special building and had increased its student body up to 1226 with the nearest planned quantity of 4000, in 1916 State Duma granted it with the status and rights of a governmental higher educational institution – Kharkiv Institute of Commerce. Within 1918-1921 Simon Kuznets was a student at the institute and had studied basic economics there.

1920s-1980s 
During the subsequent reorganizations, partly provoked by the anti-Soviet activity of the institute's faculty, the academy was initially transformed into the Kharkov Institute of National Economy (1921), and then, in 1930, divided into relatively small branch-wise colleges. Especially, its Department of Industry became the Kharkov Engineering-Economic Institute designed to train the specialist, so-called “engineer-economists” (industrial economists) for the Ukrainian heavy industry: mining, metallurgy, basic chemical and coke-chemical, machine-building factories and R&D facilities. Following the Soviet times tradition, October 1, 1930, marked as the official founding date of the university.
The institute rendered wide advisory help to the industrial enterprises in reconstruction, technological upgrading, increasing of labour productivity and economic efficiency, cost-effectiveness analysis. During this period, the institute had been creating advanced system of retraining and improvement of professional skill of the middle and chief executive personnel of the industry's management. In 1950s professor Evsei Liberman organized and guided the research laboratory. Its research was generalized as a basis of economic reform in 1965 in the USSR. Since the early 1960s the institute also taught specialists for designing and maintaining the automated industrial control systems. Since the 1980s, also – the specialists in foreign trade and international economics.

Today 
After general curriculum of the Institute had been basically revised, in 1994 Institute was granted with the highest Level IV government's accreditation and on 20 April 1994 was transformed into the Kharkiv State University of Economics. Since August 21, 2004 – the university was awarded the status of National; on October 14, 2013 – named after Simon Kuznets. In 2007 the university was conferred on the Order of Friendship of Vietnam.
Since 2000 the university have being multiply expanded its operating scale in educational and research activity. The university occupies leading position among economic universities in Eastern Ukraine region with 710 members of academic staff and more than 12,000 students in 2011. There have been reestablished cohesion between academic and research activity that had been extrinsic for the soviet-type educational system. The university was a pioneer institution in Ukraine in implementation of Bologna educational standards, introduction of variable studying courses as a part of curriculum, development of interactive learning technologies, broadening of international cooperation. Furthermore, the Universities campus is being underwent the large program of reconstruction resulted in the considerable growth of the actual space of its lecture-halls, labs, dormitories and sports facilities.

Rectors of the university and preceding higher educational institutions:
Timofeev Vladimir Fedorovich             (1912 - 1919)
Fomin Petr Ivanovich                     (1920 - 1923)
Sokolin Yakov Aleksandrovich             (1923 - 1926)
Velichko Lev Isaakovich                  (1927 - 1928)
Kustolyan Evgeny  Aleksandrovich         (1929 - 1930)
Bidnyj Vasily Gerasimovich               (1930)
Tolstov Ivan Ivanovich                   (1932 - 1933)
Bragin Ivan Dmitrievich                  (1934 - 1938)
Yampolsky Stephan Mikhailovich           (1938 - 1941)
Sazonov Alexander Vasilijevich           (1943 - 1947)
Teslenko-Ponomarenko Feodosiy Fedotovich (1947 - 1965)
Shtets Konstantin Aleksandrovich         (1966 - 1977)
Siroshtan Nikolai Antonovich             (1978 - 1999)
Ponomarenko Volodymyr Stepanovich        (since 2000)

Academics

Organization 
The university includes the following divisions:

 Faculty of Account and Audit
 Faculty of Management and Marketing
 Faculty of Finance
 Faculty of Economic Informatics
 Faculty of International Economic Relations
 Faculty of Economy and Law

Furthermore, there are subsidiaries, research and other associated divisions including:

 Center for Educational Innovation Technologies
 Laboratory for evaluating levels of creativity and intelligence
 Center for distance and correspondence education

Courses and programs 
26 academic programs in BA, Expert ("specialitet"), Master, Candidate of Economic Sciencies and Doctor of Economic Sciencies degrees preparation are available for Ukrainian and International students. Teaching is possible in Ukrainian (Russian) or English languages.

Multimedia tutorials production 
Starting in 2011 the university develops a wide range of multimedia electronic books and courses based on the Adobe Captivate platform. The Ministry of Education and Science of Ukraine regarded such activity as innovative in Ukraine. Up to 2015 a predominant number of academic courses in KhNEU is planned to be supplied with multimedia manuals as a part of the usual educational techniques.

Personal Training Systems 
Since 2006 KhNEU introduced a variative part (free electives) of individual students curriculum.

Furthermore, Portal of electronic distance learning provides better access to training resources and improves communication between teachers and students. University's standards for distance learning via the Internet is based on Moodle environment. Available to students are more than 550 e-learning courses (2010). KNUE also is the developer of distance learning systems for Kharkiv secondary schools.

Science 
Development of the research activity is a foreground of the university's strategy. Scientific research is seeing as a basic condition for improving the quality of education. The university has close cooperation with the Research Centre for Industrial Development Problems NAS of Ukraine.

The university's strategy of development is based on assumption that so-called scientific schools can support the progressive advance in key directions of research and educational sphere. Now such schools exist in the field of strategic management of the industrial enterprises, economic cybernetics, a tax policy, management of social and economic development of regions.

Strategy of the socio-economic development of the Kharkiv region 
Since 2001, KhNUE's scientists have been working up on a series of research projects aimed to the elaboration of the conceptions of socio-economic development of the Kharkiv region. The first of these was initiated by the Head of Kharkiv Regional State Administration Evgen Kushnaryov and conducted by the KhNEU's Research Laboratory of socio-economic problems of society under his guidance. The Strategy for the period up to 2010 was presented to the Kharkiv regional parliament and the scientific community of the city in 2003. In 2008, the new Strategy covered period 2010-2015 (under the guidance of A.Avakov) . In 2010, a joint team of representatives of the city authorities, practitioners, scholars and the Research Centre for Industrial Problems (under the guidance of M.Dobkin) presented Scientific and practical report "Basis for sustainable development of the Kharkiv region up to 2020". The report was adopted by the regional parliament on 23 December 2010.

International conferences and business forums 
KhNEU is the venue for representative business forums of both regional and national scale. These were the International scientific and practical conference for the development of the socio-economic development program for the Kharkiv region (2001, 2004, 2010), the International Conference of Regional and Local Economic Development (2001), the Ukrainian-Russian Investment Forum (2003), the International economic Forum "Regional Cooperation" (2003), Environmental Forum (2004, 2006), International Tourism Forum "Kharkiv: Partnership in Tourism" (2010) and others. Every year the university held or provides a platform for about ten scientific conferences.

Scientific Journals 
The acts as a publisher or cofounder of three scientific journals.

"Economics of Development" ("" ISSN 1683-1942) is a quarterly peer-reviewed academic journal established in 2002. It publishes original research papers in relatively wide range of fields of economics.

"Management of development" ("" specializes on students' papers and conference proceedings.

"Business Inform" ("" ISSN 2222-4459) is a co-founded peer-reviewed academic journal established in 1992 and edited by KhNUE and the Research Centre for Industrial Development Problems.

Library 

KhNUE Library housed in the renovated scientific library building of 4000 sq m. The library consists of 5 sections with 12 reading rooms for 460 seats and 12 subscriptions. Since 2009, readers have open access to full-text documents.
The librarian complex operates with automated cataloging literature system and its reading rooms are provided with up-to-date computer systems supplying unlimited Internet and specialized database access. Particularly in the library operate centers of Innovative Knowledge of the World Bank and EU Information Center. By means of the Centers readers can access the information and analytical resources of these organizations.

International Partnership 
KNUE is a member of the Magna Charta Universitatum (2004), Association of Economic Universities of South and Eastern Europe and the Black Sea Region (2008), Agence universitaire de la Francophonie (2009) European University Association (2009). Agreements on cooperation and partnership relations established with more than 40 universities in the EU, Russia and the CIS countries, USA and Canada, the countries of East Asia (2010).

The university has collaborative master's "double diploma" programs with the Lumière University Lyon 2 (France) and the University of Applied Sciences Technikum Wien (Austria). French-Ukrainian MBA program “Business-Informatics” has worked successfully since 2005. In 2010 the program obtained the highest mark A+ of the Association on assessment of research and higher education (AERES, France). According to research of SMBG Consulting Group the program is included in top 10 best MBA programs Business Intelligence in France in 2013 and 2014. From 2015 a part of students of the program “Business-informatics” will undergo one-year training in the University Monpellier 2 on the joint MBA program “Creating new innovative companies”.

Students' life 
KhNUE promoted actively the students' social, public, cultural and voluntary activity. The university has the Youth Organization, Youth Center, and more than thirty amateur groups. There were established traditional festivals named "Student Spring", "Debut", KVN, "Mister" and "Miss KhNUE", KVN (the university's version of "Club of the Funny and Inventive" show), Debate and oratorical tournaments, "The Golden Compass" competition and others. Rich cultural life along with wide range of cultural and social opportunities for students are one of the distinctive features distinguishing KhNUE among universities of Ukraine.

Youth Organization 
The Youth Organization founded in 1999 traditionally occupies leading position in Kharkiv region as an area of many colleges and universities (the 1st largest educational center of Ukraine) and in Ukraine as a whole. The Youth Organization is an active participant in regional and Ukrainian actions: All-Ukrainian School of Young Leaders, Ukrainian festival "Students' republic", the Students' mayor of Kharkiv (nominations 2004, 2005. It is the co-founder of Kharkiv Student Youth Union, Regional Coordinator of Ukrainian Students Rada (USR) in Kharkiv; KhNEU's students Vladimir Shemaev and  Natalia Yakunina were the USR's elected leaders in 2006-2007 and in 2008-2010 respectively.

Youth Center 
Youth Center (Student Club) KhNUE was founded in 2000. Youth Center brings together and assists creative teams, i.e. provides a general support for the students activities. In 2010, among teams from different genres, there were skiffle-group of pop dance "Joy", pop dance band «Emotion», folk vocal-instrumental ensemble "Roxolana", chorus "Vernіsazh", vocal ensembleы "Opium", "Nathnennya"("Afflatus"), vocal band "New People", vocal and instrumental ensemble, an orchestra of wind instruments, stage theater «Empire» and others.

"Student Spring" 
"Student Spring" is a traditional, since 2001, annual university festival.

"Debut" 
Similarly, the "Debut" festival is dedicated and performed by first-year students.

"Inzhek" Travel Club 
"Inzhek" Travel Club provides a support for traveling activity for students and faculty.

Fan Club "Inzhek-Metalist" 
Fan Club "Inzhek Metalis" started its activity in February 2010 as a joint project "Towards each other" by KhNUE and Kharkiv FC "Metalist".

"The Golden Compass" 
The university is a venue for international student competition of PR-projects "The Golden Compass", founded in 2007. The competition aims to stimulate creativeness and practical initiatives of students enrolled in specialized educational fields: marketing, advertising, PR. Now "The Golden Compass" is a professional team competition. Before 2013 it was a part of promotional activities for tender projects, from 2014 - Startup initiatives. Participants are expected to complete projects for real enterprises and campaigns. The jury consists of representatives of the business only. The competition is supported by international and national companies and professional associations of Ukraine - Ukrainian Association of Public Relations (UAPR), Ukrainian PR-League.

Sports 
In 2003, the organizational system of students' sport activity was endorsed by the Minister of Education and Science as model and was recommended for all educational institutions of Ukraine. By 2013 there were annual competitions in 10 sports and in mini-football tournament on the Rector's Cup.

Aerobics, Fitness 
Aerobics, fitness aerobics, gymnastics, cheerleading.

Athleticism 
Weight lifting, weightlifting, powerlifting, athleticism.

Basketball 
Men's and women's basketball teams of the university.

Volleyball 

Women's volleyball team KNUE founded in 1999 and since 2000 is a member of the Graduate Students League of Ukraine. Regular participant of competitions held Volleyball Federation Kharkiv region and the Regional Department of Physical Education and Sport.

Table tennis 
Training groups of table tennis is available both for students and for faculty and staff of KhNUE. The university's team takes part in friendly matches with other Kharkiv universities teams and Kharkiv Sports Festival of Universities. There are personal championships among foreign students, the personal championship KhNUE in memory of L.S.Luchenko, faculties' matches.

Sambo and Judo 
The university has a developed network of Sambo and Judo acting teams. Team championships are held among the faculties, the individual championship, and performances. KhNUE's team is a participant of the International tournament in memory of Vladimir Kiselyov.

Sport tourism 
Started in 2006 sport tourism classes are held on the technique of walking, mountain biking, and boating. KhNUE teams were the  repeated awardee of regional and inter-university competitions.

Football 

There is a men's university team. Football championships are conducted among students' hostels teams and a futsal competition among faculties. The KhNUE's team was a winner of the "Metalist Student League" in 2013.

Checkers and Chess 

The university's chess club was opened in 2011.

Notable alumni 

 Simon Smith Kuznets, American economist, Nobel prize winner (1971).
 Evsei Liberman, Soviet economist, architect of the economic reforms of 1965.
Maria Quisling, wife of Nazi collaborator Vidkun Quisling.
Mykhailo Chechetov, Ukrainian politician.
 Victoria Spartz, member of the Indiana Senate, 2020 Republican candidate for Indiana's 5th congressional district

Ratings

External links 
 Simon Kuznets Kharkiv National University of Economics - Official site
 «Economics of Development» - International economic peer-reviewed open access scientific journal
 «Business Inform» - International economic peer-reviewed open access scientific journal
 KhNUE Open Access Scientific Repository
 University's Library
 KhNUE Portal of electronic distance learning
 Publishing House "INZHEK"
 Research and Development Centre for Industrial Problems of Development of NAS of Ukraine (RDC IPD NASU)

Notes and references

 
Educational institutions established in 1930
Buildings and structures in Kharkiv
1930 establishments in Ukraine
National universities in Ukraine